Saint Nemesion (or Nemesian, Nemesius, Nemesis; died 250) was an Egyptian martyr in Alexandria, Egypt during the persecutions of Christians by the Roman emperor Decius.
A group of other Christians were martyred at the same time.
His feast day is 19 December, or 10 September in some calendars.

Monks of Ramsgate account

The monks of St Augustine's Abbey, Ramsgate wrote in their Book of Saints (1921),

Shea's account

John Gilmary Shea (1824–1892) in his Pictorial Lives of the Saints wrote,

Butler's account

The hagiographer Alban Butler (1710–1773) wrote in his Lives of the Fathers, Martyrs, and Other Principal Saints under December XIX,

Notes

Sources

 

Saints from Roman Egypt
250 deaths